Michael Burlingame may refer to:

 Michael Burlingame (filmmaker), New York filmmaker
 Michael Burlingame (historian), American historian